Elizabeth Tudor (Элизабет Тюдор; full name Lala Elizabeth Tudor Hassenberg (Лала Элизабет Тюдор Гассенберг), also known as Lala Hasanova (Лала Гасанова)) (born July 26, 1978 in Baku), is an Azerbaijani-Russian science fiction writer and lawyer of Jewish ancestry.

Biography
Born in Baku, Tudor graduated from the Azerbaijan International University in 1998, the Florida International University in 2013 and the University of Miami School of Law in 2015. She started to write in 1994, having selected science fiction as her chosen genre.
Tudor is a member of the International Federation of Russian-speaking Writers and the Writers' Union of Azerbaijan. She is also a member of international writers' unions such as The New Contemporary and Broad Universe. In 2016, Elizabeth Tudor became a member of the Authors Guild, the America's oldest and largest professional organization for writers.

Career
Tudor's first novel was published in 2001, the science fiction novel War of Times. In 2002, Elizabeth Tudor was accepted into the Union of Writers of Azerbaijan. In the same year her two new books, the science-fiction novel Elects of Heavens and the collection of fantastic and adventure stories Murderer Chupacabra were published.

In 2003, she finished the historical-fantastic novel Secret of Underwater Caspian. 2004 was marked by the publication of the science fiction novel Seven Envoys, which she devoted to the memory of English writer Walter Scott.  In 2005 two other books were published – Exiles of Heavens and Masters of heavens.

In 2007, Tudor's next science-fiction novel Collision, was dedicated to the Governor of California Arnold Schwarzenegger. This was the only book from Azerbaijan included in a Russian literary festival held in Stuttgart, Germany, in 2008. In the same year as Collision, the collection of stories The Shadow of Centuries was issued. 

Her series Saros of historical fantasy novels will be reportedly a 13-volume series.

Works

Novels 

 "Война времен" (2001) (War of times)
 "Избранники небес" (2002) (Elects of heavens)
 "Тайны подводного Каспия" (2004) (Secrets of the underwater Caspian)
 "Семь посланников" (2004) (Seven envoys)
 "Изгнанники небес" (2005) (Exiles of heavens)
 "Повелители небес" (2005) (Masters of heavens)
 "Коллизия" (2007) (Collision)
 Сарос. "Кевин Коннор" (2009) (Saros: Kevin Connor)
 Сарос. «Аарон Шмуэль» (2009) (Saros: Aaron Shmuel)
 Сарос. «Барак Келлерман» (2011) (Saros: Barak Kellerman)
 Сарос. «Борис Гроссман» (2013) (Saros: Boris Grossman)
 Сарос. «Аббас Алекперов» (2014) (Saros: Abbas Alakbarov)

Short novels 
 "Черная смерть в белую зиму" 
 "Ложь, предательство и месть" 
 "Тень веков" (2007)

Stories 

 "Убийца Чупакабра" (2002) (Murderer Chupacabra)
 "Если наступит завтра…" ("If tomorrow comes....")
 "Захватчики миров" 
 "Горячий капучино"  (Hot Capuccino)
 "Эльютера – остров грез" ("Eleuthera - the island of dreams")
 "Время, взятое взаймы" 
 "Человек-шок" 
 "Интеллигент-убийца" 
 "Убийца времени" ("The Time Killer")
 "Сон во сне" 
 "Воришка Бен" 
 "Заключенный 1333" (2008) (Prisoner 1333)

References

External links
Official website of Elizabeth Tudor (Lala Hassenberg)
Elizabeth Tudor (Lala Hassenberg) interview at FIU Alumni Association
Elizabeth Tudor - ALUMNI AUTHOR SERIES
Elizabeth Tudor (Lala Hassenberg) at the Yonge Street Review

Azerbaijani novelists
Azerbaijani women novelists
Azerbaijani women short story writers
Azerbaijani science fiction writers
1978 births
Living people
Azerbaijani Jews
Women science fiction and fantasy writers
Russian-language writers from Azerbaijan
20th-century Azerbaijani novelists
21st-century Azerbaijani novelists
20th-century Azerbaijani women writers
20th-century Azerbaijani writers
21st-century Azerbaijani women writers
Writers from Baku
21st-century Azerbaijani writers